Richard James Mann (born 26 September 1982) is an English former first-class cricketer.

Mann was born at Ipswich in September 1982. He was educated at Ipswich School, before going up to St John's College, Cambridge. While studying at Cambridge, he made three first-class appearances for Cambridge University against Oxford University in The University Matches of 2003, 2004 and 2005. He scored 150 runs in these matches, making two half centuries with a high score of 63. In addition to playing first-class cricket for Cambridge University, Mann also made two appearances in 2003 for Cambridge UCCE against Essex and Kent.

Notes and references

External links

1982 births
Living people
Alumni of St John's College, Cambridge
Cambridge MCCU cricketers
Cambridge University cricketers
Cricketers from Ipswich
English cricketers
People educated at Ipswich School